The 1971 E3 Harelbeke was the 14th edition of the E3 Harelbeke cycle race and was held on 27 March 1971. The race started and finished in Harelbeke. The race was won by Roger De Vlaeminck.

General classification

References

1971 in Belgian sport
1971
1971 in road cycling